William Albert Catterall (born 12 October 1946 in Providence, Rhode Island) is an American pharmacologist and neurobiologist, who researches ion channels. He currently serves as a professor of pharmacology at the University of Washington School of Medicine in Seattle, Washington and is known for the discovery of the sodium and calcium voltage-gated ion channels. Catterall received his B.A. in chemistry from Brown University in 1968 and his Ph.D. in physiological chemistry from Johns Hopkins University School of Medicine in 1972. He did his postdoctoral training in neurobiology and molecular pharmacology as a Muscular Dystrophy Association Fellow with Marshall Nirenberg at the NIH from 1972 to 1974. After three years as a staff scientist at the NIH, Catterall joined the University of Washington in 1977 as an associate professor of pharmacology. He earned full professorship in 1981 and served as chair of the University of Washington's pharmacology department from 1984 to 2016.

Honors and awards
Catterall has been a fellow of the American Association for the Advancement of Science since 2010. In 2003, he received the 16th annual Bristol-Myers Squibb Award for Distinguished Achievement in Neuroscience Research, in recognition of his pioneering research into sodium and calcium channel proteins. In 2008, he was elected a Foreign Member of the Royal Society. Catterall was awarded the Canada International Gairdner Award in 2010.
 I. & H. Wachter Award, I. & H. Wachter Foundation (2010)
 Bard Lecture, Johns Hopkins University (2010)

References

1946 births
American neuroscientists
American pharmacologists
University of Washington faculty
Living people
Fellows of the American Association for the Advancement of Science
Foreign Members of the Royal Society
Fellows of the American Society for Pharmacology and Experimental Therapeutics
Johns Hopkins School of Medicine alumni
Brown University alumni
Members of the National Academy of Medicine